Ganluo County (Yi:  ga lo xiep) is a county of Sichuan Province, China. It is under the administration of the Liangshan Yi Autonomous Prefecture.

Administrative divisions
As of 2022, Ganluo County administers the following 9 towns and 4 townships:

 Xinshiba Town
 Tianba Town
 Haitang Town
 Jimi Town
 Sijue Town
 Puchang Town
 Yutian Town
 Wushidaqiao Town
 Suwei Town
 Xincha Township
 Tuanjie Township
 Gari Towmship
 Shadai Township

Climate

References

Liangshan Yi Autonomous Prefecture
Amdo
County-level divisions of Sichuan